The Khulna District (Khulna Jela also Khulna Zila) is a district of Bangladesh. It is located in the Khulna Division, bordered on the north by the Jessore District and the Narail District, on the south by the Bay of Bengal, on the east by the Bagerhat District, and on the west by the Satkhira District. It was the very first sub-division of United Bengal Province established in 1842 under Jessore district. On 1 June 1882, by notification of the official gazette published from Kolkata, Khulna and Bagerhat sub-division of Jessore district and Satkhira sub-division of 24 Pargana district formed the new Zila 'Khulna'.

Geography and climate
It borders Jessore District to the north, Narail District to the northeast, Bagerhat District to the east, the Bay of Bengal to the south, and Satkhira District to the west.

Major rivers of Khulna District are the Rupsa (a continuation of the Bhairab and Atrai), Arpangachhia, Shibsa, Pasur, and the Koyra.

Demographics 

At the time of the 2011 census, Khulna district had a population of 2,318,527 of which 1,175,686 were males and 1,142,841 were females. Rural population was 1,540,939 (66.46%) while urban population was 777,588 (33.54%). Khulna had a literacy rate 60.14% for the population 7 years and above: 64.32% for males and 55.85% for females.

76.63% of the population was Muslim and 22.68% Hindu at the time of the 2011 census. There was a small minority of Christians as well which was 0.66% of the population.

Khulna was a Hindu-majority part of Bangladesh before Partition, but during the massive riots in the 1950s and 60s most of the Hindus there fled to India. The population of Hindus and Christians has remained constant since 1981, but their absolute numbers have fallen massively.

Education 
The district contains educational institutions including:

 School
 Government Coronation Secondary Girls' School 
 Government Daulatpur Muhsin High School
 Khulna Zilla School

Colleges
 Govt Majid Memorial City College  
 Khulna Government Model School and Collage
 Khulna Medical College
Khulna Collectorate Public School and College
Universities 
 Khulna University of Engineering & Technology
 Khulna University
 Khulna Agricultural University

See also
 Districts of Bangladesh
 Khulna Division

Notes

References

 
Districts of Bangladesh
Districts of Bangladesh established before 1971